Piero Ferrucci is a psychotherapist and a philosopher. He graduated from the University of Torino in 1970. He was trained by Roberto Assagioli, the founder of psychosynthesis, and has written several books:

WHAT WE MAY BE: The Vision and Techniques of Psychosynthesis (1982) is a comprehensive description of this approach, with exercises and practical tips.

INEVITABLE GRACE (1990) is the result of a nine-year research in the lives of hundreds of creative and enlightened people of all times and cultures. It describes their peak experiences and highest moments, as well as how they achieved their breakthroughs.

WHAT OUR CHILDREN TEACH US (1997) is about what we can learn from babies and children as parents, relatives or educators, and how we can grow by being around them.

THE POWER OF KINDNESS (2007) is a view of kindness from the perspective of eighteen different qualities, such as gratitude, warmth, generosity, etc. With a foreword by the Dalai Lama.

BEAUTY AND THE SOUL (2010) is about how the experience of beauty can change our life.

YOUR INNER WILL (2014) provides concrete, meaningful lessons in developing internal willpower during times of person crisis.

Ferrucci also co-authored The Child of Your Dreams (1992) with Laura Huxley, and edited The Human Situation (1977), a book of lectures by Aldous Huxley.

Piero Ferrucci has had a psychotherapy practice for the past thirty-five years and teaches in several European countries.

Ferrucci is the nephew of Aldous Huxley and Laura Huxley. He has a wife and two sons, who live with him in Florence.

References

1946 births
Living people
Transpersonal psychology
20th-century Italian philosophers
21st-century Italian philosophers
Italian psychologists